Marek Moszczyński (16 January 1949 – 14 December 2021) was a Polish politician. A member of the Civic Platform, he served as Deputy Marshal of Lower Silesian Voivodeship from 2003 to 2004 and again from 2006 to 2008.

References

1949 births
2021 deaths
Civic Platform politicians
Politicians from Wrocław
Wrocław University of Technology alumni
Polish computer scientists